KUJH is the student television station affiliated with The University of Kansas, with studios in the Hall Center for Humanities on the University of Kansas's Lawrence campus. The station is owned by the University of Kansas. The Student television station broadcast predominantly local news programs produced by University of Kansas students, as well as talk shows surrounding pop culture and sports. The station also airs club sports events, such as KU Hockey and KU Rugby matches.

Its primary purpose is to serve as a hands-on "laboratory" for its journalism students, though students in different degree programs are allowed to apply to join the news team.

The channel is on Midco's cable television lineup on channel 31, and on the University of Kansas's cable system available to students who live in on-campus residencies.

History
KUJH-LP began testing on February 10, 1995. Regular programming began April 23, 1996, with much of the content filled by the St. Paul, Minnesota-based All News Channel.

Until about 2005, KUJH broadcast locally produced independent films and TV shows from the university, local and regional film scene. One program of note was "Out of Focus"; hosted by then KU Film School student Chris Martin. The program was a mix of interviews with local film makers as well as airings of short films and previews.  However, in 2005, programs that were produced by non-journalism students were removed from the station's programming.

The station's license was cancelled by the Federal Communications Commission on June 9, 2014, for failure to file a license renewal application.

Newscasts
Newscasts are only broadcast during the school year. News programming produced by KUJH includes:
 On the Boulevard
 KUJH-TV News
 Jayhawk Sports Report
The Next
 On the Hill

See also
 KJHK

References

External links
 

Student television stations in the United States
University of Kansas
Lawrence, Kansas
Television stations in Kansas
Television channels and stations established in 1995
1995 establishments in Kansas
Defunct television stations in the United States
Television channels and stations disestablished in 2014